Einar Iveland (9 May 1892 – 15 May 1975) was a Norwegian politician for the Liberal Party.

He was born in Iveland.

He was elected to the Norwegian Parliament from Aust-Agder in 1950, but was not re-elected in 1954. He had previously served in the position of deputy representative during the term 1934–1936.

Iveland held various positions in Iveland municipality council from 1933 to 1950, and was chairman of Aust-Agder county council in 1940 and 1945–1949.

References

1892 births
1975 deaths
Liberal Party (Norway) politicians
Members of the Storting
20th-century Norwegian politicians